Phoradendron aequatoris is a species of plant in the Santalaceae family. It is endemic to Ecuador.  Its natural habitat is subtropical or tropical moist lowland forests.

References

Endemic flora of Ecuador
aequatoris
Critically endangered plants
Taxonomy articles created by Polbot
Plants described in 1897